The 2011 monsoon season saw one record flood event in Indochina across several countries and a few separate limited flood events parts of the same nations: Thailand, Cambodia and Myanmar and heavy flooding in Vietnam.  Meanwhile, Laos also sustained flood damage.  By late October 2011, 2.3 million people have been hit by flooding in Thailand, while the flooding in Cambodia has affected close to 1.2 million people, according to estimates by the United Nations.  Unrelated to the northern floods, Southern Thailand near Malaysia has been lashed with flooding in early November and again in December also affecting as far north as Chumporn.  In the November event, Southern Thailand near Hat Yai was hit, North-central Vietnam had their own event in October.  Myanmar had reported a series of limited but still deadly and destructive events from June to October.

The 2011 typhoon season in Philippines overlapped the monsoon season in Indochina, and the country was hit by a series of storms over the course of 4 months: Typhoon Nesat in September, which was followed shortly after by Typhoon Nalgae, and then in December by Tropical Storm Washi, which hit on an unusual track, timing and location.

All told, well over 2,828 have lost their lives to a series of flooding events of varying origins in Southeast Asia since August 2011 in the above-mentioned nations, worldwide supply-chain disruptions occurred in technology sector, and billion-dollar losses and severe parts shortages rippled to corporations of developed nations, and the assumption of safety from flood waters was put into question in many nations thought or assumed to be prepared.

Damage and casualties

In Myanmar, the Mandalay, Magwe, Bago, Irrawaddy, Sagaing, Kayin, Mon, Kayah, Chin and Rakhine States and regions are heavily affected.  " there were cases of deaths and loss of homes in Kyauk Hta Yan, Htonebo, Myo Lulin and Tatkone villages in Myothit Township, Magwe Region" in early October.  "The local authorities and parties have not provided assistance. These local authorities even harassed us by questioning us and prohibited us to give assistance.”  Flooding also has been affecting Shan State. In August, towards the beginning of the monsoon, central Bago city was inundated requiring boats for navigation and some deaths.

See also
 2013 Southeast Asian floods
 2011 Thai floods
 2011 Sindh floods
 2011 China floods

References

Floods in Asia
2011 floods in Asia
Environment of Southeast Asia